City View Independent School District is a public school district based in Wichita Falls, Texas (USA).

Northwestern portions of Wichita Falls are served by the district, as well as a small section of Pleasant Valley.

In 2009, the school district was rated "recognized" by the Texas Education Agency.

Schools
City View Junior/Senior High School (Grades 6-12)
City View Elementary School (Grades PK-5)

References

External links
 

School districts in Wichita County, Texas
Education in Wichita Falls, Texas